Xu Xiaobo (Chinese: 徐小波; born 16 February 1991) is a Chinese football player.

Club career
Xu Xiaobo was promoted to Chinese Super League side Chongqing Lifan's first team squad in 2010. On 13 April 2011, he made his senior debut in a 2–1 home defeat against Shenyang Dongjin, coming on as a substitute for Luo Yi. He scored his first senior goal on 11 May 2011, in the second round of 2011 Chinese FA Cup against Henan Jianye. On 8 March 2015, he made his Super League debut in the season's first match which Chongqing Lifan lost to Beijing Guoan 3–0.

Club career statistics 
Statistics accurate as of match played 30 October 2016.

Honours

Club
Chongqing Lifan
China League One: 2014

References

1991 births
Living people
Chinese footballers
Footballers from Guizhou
Chongqing Liangjiang Athletic F.C. players
Chinese Super League players
China League One players
Association football defenders